Cheryl Kay Spencer is the Jamaican Permanent Representative to the United Nations (UN) and its Specialized Agencies in Geneva, Switzerland after having served as High Commissioner to South Africa.  She presented her credentials on February 12, 2019.

Spencer earned a bachelor's degree in International Relations from the University of the West Indies.

References

Jamaican women ambassadors
University of the West Indies alumni
Permanent Representatives of Jamaica to the United Nations
High Commissioners of Jamaica to South Africa
Year of birth missing (living people)
Living people